Brian Dunlop (1938–2009) was a still life and figurative  painter born in Sydney, Australia. He won the Sulman Prize in 1980 for The Old Physics Building (genre painting). He was a finalist in the 2004 Archibald Prize with Brian Kenna: imagines Urfa. Dunlop painted in Sydney and Ebenezer in New South Wales and in Tuscany, Rome, Skyros, Majorca, Morocco and India.  He painted portraits of public figures, including Queen Elizabeth II in 1984 for the 150th anniversary of the founding of Victoria. Dunlop settled in Panton Hill and then Port Fairy in Victoria.  He held many exhibitions in Sydney and Melbourne.  Dunlop died on 11 December 2009 as the result of a long-standing heart condition.

Further reading
Lynne Strahan, Brian Dunlop, Craftsman House, Roseville, NSW, 1990.
Paul William White, The Art of Brian Dunlop, Craftsman House, Sydney, 1984.

External links
A selection of Brian Dunlop paintings
Official website

1938 births
2009 deaths
Artists from Sydney
20th-century Australian painters
20th-century Australian male artists
Australian male painters